Yehoshua Lakner (b. Bratislava, Czechoslovakia, 24 April 1924; d. Zürich, Switzerland, 5 December 2003) (Hebrew: יהושוע לקנר) was a composer of contemporary classical music.  He settled in Palestine in 1941, and relocated to Zürich in 1963.

He studied with the American composer Aaron Copland at Tanglewood in 1952.

Awards
Engel Prize of the city of Tel-Aviv (1958)
Salomon David Steinberg Foundation
City of Zurich Sabbatical year for composition (1987)

References

External links
Yehoshua Lakner official site

1924 births
2003 deaths
Israeli composers
Hungarian Jews
Czechoslovak emigrants to Mandatory Palestine
20th-century classical composers
Musicians from Bratislava
Male classical composers
20th-century male musicians
Israeli emigrants to Switzerland